Angers Cathedral is a Roman Catholic church dedicated to Saint Maurice in Angers, France. It is the seat of the Bishops of Angers.

Built between the 11th and 16th centuries, it is known for its mixture of Romanesque and Gothic architecture, its ornate Baroque altar and sculpture. It also has an extensive collection of stained glass windows, including the transept's window of Saint Julian, considered to be a masterpiece of French 13th-century glasswork. as a national monument of France.

History

The first cathedral 
The earliest cathedral on the site was dedicated to the Virgin Mary but in 396 Saint Martin, the Archbishop of Tours, added the Theban Egyptian martyr Saint Maurice to the dedication. He had acquired a relic of some of the blood of the members of the Theban Legion, who were martyred with Saint Maurice in the 3rd century for converting to Christianity. The relic was brought to Tours and later, according to the legend, a phial of it was given to Angers.

In the 7th century, an additional devotion to Saint Maurilius, the Bishop of Angers in the 4th century, began. A biography of him was written and in 873 his body was transferred to the cathedral. For 200 years Saints Maurilius and Maurice were frequently mentioned together as the patron saints of the cathedral but gradually Saint Maurice became the primary patron.

The Romanesque to the Baroque cathedral 
At the beginning of the 11th century, Hubert de Vendôme, the Bishop of Angers from 1010 to 1047, decided to build a new cathedral in the Romanesque style to replace the existing church. The new church was consecrated on 16 August 1025, but in 1032 it was ravaged by a fire.

Geoffroy de Tours, the Bishop of Angers from 1081 to 1093, ordered the reconstruction of the cathedral, which continued under the supervision of his successors, Renaud de Martigné (1102–1125), Ulger (1125–1148) and Normand de Doué (1148–1153). The altar crucifix was blessed in 1051 and the new altar was consecrated in 1096.

In the mid-12th century, the cathedral underwent another transformation. Atop the Romanesque lower walls new walls and vaults were constructed in the Angevin variation of Gothic architecture; which took its name from the historic province of Anjou, a fiefdom of the French crown. The vaults were composed of high crossing ribs, supported by rows of clustered columns and pillars in the nave below. This allowed the construction of very large windows on the upper walls between the ribs. filling the interior with light.

The rebuilding of the nave was followed by that of the choir and the new transept. This was carried out between 1235 and 1274, largely under the direction of Guillaume de Beaumont, the Bishop of Angers from 1203 to 1240. The choir followed a similar design as the nave, with the grand arches replaced by large blind arches topped with a narrow passageway, now decorated with a wrought-iron railing, below the large windows of the upper level. The arches are taller a more slender than those of the nave, and the decoration more stylised.

In the 17th century the interior of the church underwent another rebuilding; Angers Cathedral was one of the first in France to redesign its interior following the directives of the Council of Trent, to make the interior more welcoming and decorative for ordinary worshippers, and to remove the barriers between the clergy and the congregation. This was the arrival of Baroque architecture into churches. The jubé, or rood screen, which separated the clergy and congregation was removed, and the altar was moved from the center of the choir to a position closer to the congregation in the nave. The majestic new baldaquin over the altar, with columns of red marble supporting a great crown of filled with sculpture, was installed in 1757. The altar beneath faces both toward the clergy in the choir and the worshippers in the nave.

Renaissance and later additions 
In the 16th century, the architect Jean Delespine constructed a new base to the two towers. The lower portio, in the new Renaissance style, was covered with sculpture depicting Saint Maurice and his seven knight-companions and their martyrdom. They also gave the central tower a Renaissance-style hexagonal crown, finished in 1515. Another Renaissance spire was built atop the south tower, completed in 1523. The deteriorating original sculptures were largely replaced with copies in 1909.

19th and 20th century 
In 1806, the mediaeval porch on the west front had to be demolished because of its dilapidated condition. Built in the Angevin Gothic style in front of the entrance gate, it had two levels. Four pointed arches are the only surviving vestiges of the original porch. In the mid-19th century, the Neo-Gothic pulpit was created by the Bishop Choyer, with the support of Eugène Viollet-le-Duc, who was overseeing multiple Gothic restoration projects in France.

Various reconstruction projects were developed in the 20th century but none of them went beyond the planning stage.

Design

The original Romanesque church was rebuilt with Gothic details in the mid-12th century. The single aisle was vaulted with pointed arches resting on a re-clad interior elevation. The nave consists of three simple bays, with single bays on either side of a crossing forming a transept, followed by a single-bay choir, backed by an apse.

Dimensions
 Overall length: 
 Width of the west front: 
 Height of the vault of the nave: 
 Width of the nave:  (same as the Chartres Cathedral)
 Length of the nave: 
 Height of the two spires:

Exterior

The west front 

The west front clearly illustrates the three different periods of the construction of the cathedral. The lower portions are Romanesque, with thick walls, rounded arches, and a Romanesque portal and a central window. The towers on either side are Flamboyant Gothic, with rich decoration and a delicate dissymetery. The central tower is a work of Renaissance architecture, with classical influences, built between 1533 and 1537.

The portal, much damaged and restored over the centuries, originally was protected by a porch. tympanum over the doorway represents Christ in majesty, and it is decorated the column-statues from the 12th century. The decorative ironwork on the doors dates to Romanesque period. Above the portal is a later gallery of sculptures depicting eight knights, who represent the companions of Saint Maurice, who joined him in his martyrdom. It was added in the 16th century. The originals were replaced with copies in 1909.

Interior

The nave 

The nave was constructed as a single vessel, without chapels. The current chapel on the south lower nave was originally a separate church for the parish, which was later attached to the cathedral. The lower walls are Romanesque, rebuilt in the early 11th century. In about 1150, a major rebuilding added the enormous arches between the supports of the Romanesque walls, up to the middle level of the walls. Then massive pillars of clustered columns were put in place supporting the arches of three large vaults. The space between ribs of the vaults on the upper walls was filled with very large stained glass windows, filling the interior with light.

The choir and transept 

The choir and transept were constructed after the nave, between 1235 and 1274. The walls and vaults were similar to those of the choir, except that the arcade of large pillars was replaced by blind arches, topped with a narrow passageway halfway up the wall, with a balustrade of cast iron.

The decoration of the choir is particularly notable. Angers was one of the first cathedrals in France to adapt the new Baroque style, imposed by the Vatican Council of Trent in order to make the altar more visible from the nave and to make the interior more dramatic and inspiring. The old rood screen that separated the choir from the nave was demolished, and the altar was placed between the two spaces. facing both. In 1757, the enormous Baroque ciborium or altar canopy, supported by columns of red marble and crowned with a pyramid of sculpture by Gervais was put into place.

Art and decoration

Stained glass

The oldest original window dates from about 1165 and depicts the infant Christ. At the end of the 12th century, under Bishop Raoul de Beaumont, new windows were made for the nave. Windows from this period depict the Martyrdom of Saint Catherine of Alexandria, the life of the Virgin Mary (Bay 123) and the Martyrdom of Saint Vincent. These are very good examples of the new technique of painting onto glass, or silver stain, which became popular in that century. Early windows from the late 12th and early 13th century include the Glorification of the Virgin window (Bay 123), a rare example of a window signed with the emblem of its maker.

A number of windows from the 13th century are found in the choir, including the life of Saint Jean the Baptist. Some of these windows were commissioned by Bishop Guillaume de Beaumont, whose figure appears in the windows devoted to saint Julien, and whose coat of arms appears in the window depicting the life of Saint Thomas Becket (F-108 left in the Choir). Some of the windows mix glass from different periods; the window of the Life of Saint Martin contains glass from the 16th century, from the Priory of the Verger of Seichs-sur-le-Loire, combined with earlier works from 1230 to 1235, which were originally made for the transept.

Following a fire in 1451, new windows were commissioned from André Robin representing large figures of the saints standing before architectural settings. One of his notable windows is in Bay 109, depicting Saint René. was also the creator of the two rose windows, which depict the signs of the coming end of the world, a popular theme in 15th century manuscripts, but rare in stained glass windows.

By the end of the 19th century any of the early windows had been destroyed. Other early windows in the nave were destroyed by a bomb in 1944. They were restored in the 1950s by the Paris glassmaker and painter Jacques Le Chevallier. The new windows depict the saints particularly venerated in the Angers diocese.

Wood carving – the pulpit 

The cathedral is noted for the rich wood carving of the pulpit. It was created in the 19th century by the Abbot and sculptor Choyer in the Neo-Gothic style, at the suggestion of Eugène Viollet-le-Duc, who was involved in the major restoration of the cathedral. Its carved sculpture features images of the patron of the cathedral, Saint Maurice, as well a figure of Adam supporting the pulpit from below.

Tapestries

The cathedral has a particularly fine collection of medieval tapestries. The oldest group, which depicts the Apocalypse and Acts of Revelation, was donated to the cathedral by René of Anjou in 1480. It is now displayed at the Château d'Angers. The other ninety tapestries in the collection were made in Flanders and France from the 15th to the 18th century, and were gathered together in the cathedral in the second part of the 19th century, and are one of the most important single collections in Europe. In the past they were displayed only for certain religious holidays. Now they are hung as a group only during the festivals of Saint John and Saint Maurice, with the others only displayed individually according to the liturgical calendar.

Murals 

In about 1980 several remarkable mural paintings dating from 1240 to 1260 were discovered hidden behind the elaborate 18th century woodwork in the back of the apse, which had been created by Sébastien Leyssner. They depict the miracles achieved by Saint Maurilius of Angers, a 5th-century bishop of Angers, whose miracles included the resurrection of Saint René, who later became a member of the chapter of the cathedral.

Sculpture 

The cathedral has a particularly rich collection of sculpture, ranging from Romanesque and Gothic column capitals decorated with faces, to dramatic scenes of Baroque sculpture above the main altar. There is also an assortment of tomb sculpture from different periods.

Other decorative elements 
Among the significant works in the cathedral are:
 the north transept was paved by the architect Guillaume Robin in 1453;
 the straight staircase to the library built by Guillaume Robin, also in 1453, in the south transept. He supervised the construction of the cathedral at the same time as the master glassmaker, André Robin, made the stained glass windows.

Grand organ

A pipe organ has been in the cathedral from as early as the 14th century but the current version was built only in 1617 by the organ maker, Jacques Girardet, who was probably recycling the pipes and other parts from the previous organ. An earlier organ was replaced in 1416 with a new case by Jean Chabencel but in 1451 it was destroyed by a fire. A replacement was built in 1507 on the initiative of Anne of Brittany on the original spot, the organ loft in the choir. It was restored for the first time, after another fire, in 1533 by Peter Bert and for the second time in 1701 by Marin Ingoult, who added the pedalboard. When Ingoult was done, the organ had, besides the pedalboard, 47 stops with four keyboards (manuals). In the 18th century, its case was replaced. Between 1869 and 1872, the organ was reorganized by Aristide Cavaillé-Coll. In 1957 it was electrified, adding 19 stops to make a total of 66 stops, with just three manuals and a pedalboard. It is in the balcony of the organ loft at the west end of the cathedral.

Bells

The cathedral has nine bells, housed in central tower. The Bourdon, the largest and oldest bell, with the deepest notes, is named Maurice; It was Founded by the firm of Besson, and weighs 6700 kilograms.

Burials
Yolande of Aragon
Margaret of Anjou
René of Anjou

See also
 List of Gothic cathedrals in Europe
 French Gothic architecture
 French Gothic stained glass windows

References

Bibliography (in French)

External links

Monum.fr: webpage on Angers Cathedral 
Stained Glass Windows and Sculptures of Angers Cathedral
Complete tour of all the stained glass windows is at Painton Cowen's website, The Medieval Stained Glass Photographic Archive, under the title "Cathedral of Angers"
Location of the cathedral
 
 
 
Laissez-vous conter la cathédrale Saint-Maurice : Angers Patrimoines – Angers.fr (in French)
 Cathédrale Saint-Maurice à Angers – Patrimony of Angers site (in French )

Roman Catholic cathedrals in France
Buildings and structures in Angers
Churches in Maine-et-Loire
Rebuilt buildings and structures
Burial sites of the House of Valois-Anjou